DFAF may refer to:

 Drug Free America Foundation
 Delta Force: Angel Falls